Royal Challengers Bangalore (often abbreviated as RCB) are  a franchise cricket team based in Bengaluru, Karnataka, that plays in the Indian Premier League (IPL). It was founded in 2008 by United Spirits and named after the company's liquor brand Royal Challenge.

The Royal Challengers have not won the IPL but finished runners-up on three occasions between 2009 and 2016. The team holds the records of both the highest and the lowest totals in the IPL – 263/5 and 49 respectively.

Franchise history
In September 2007, the Board of Control for Cricket in India (BCCI) announced the establishment of the Indian Premier League, a Twenty20 competition to be started in 2008. The teams for the competition, representing 8 different cities of India, including Bangalore, were put up on auction in Mumbai on 20 February 2008. The Bangalore franchise was purchased by Vijay Mallya, who paid 111.6 million for it. This was the second highest bid for a team, next only to Reliance Industries' bid of 111.9 million for the Mumbai Indians.

The brand value of Royal Challengers Bangalore was estimated to be  in 2019, according to a survey conducted by Duff & Phelps.

Team history

2008–2010: Initial seasons
Kohli-Amrish Reddy Batting

Ahead of the 2008 player auction, the IPL named Rahul Dravid as the icon player for the Bangalore franchise, which meant that Dravid would be paid 15% more than the highest bid player at the auction. The franchise acquired a number of Indian and international players at the auction such as Jacques Kallis, Anil Kumble, Zaheer Khan, Mark Boucher, Dale Steyn and Cameron White. They also signed up Ross Taylor, Misbah-ul-Haq and India under-19 World Cup winning captain Virat Kohli in the second round of auction. The team won only 4 of the 14 matches in the inaugural season, finishing seventh in the eight-team table. Only Dravid managed to score more than 300 runs in the tournament and they had to even bench their costliest foreign player Kallis for a few of the matches due to his poor form.

The string of failures midway through the season led to the sacking of the CEO Charu Sharma, who was replaced with Brijesh Patel. Team owner Vijay Mallya went on to publicly criticize Dravid and Sharma for the players selected by them at the auction and stated that his "biggest mistake was to abstain from the selection of the team." Eventually the chief cricketing officer Martin Crowe resigned.

At the 2009 player auction, the franchise signed up Kevin Pietersen for a record sum of 1.55 million, making him the joint costliest player, along with fellow Englishman Andrew Flintoff who was signed up by the Chennai Super Kings for the same amount. They also traded Zaheer Khan for Robin Uthappa with the Mumbai Indians and also roped in local batsman Manish Pandey from them. Ahead of the tournament, which was shifted to South Africa due to the general elections, the Royal Challengers named Pietersen as the team captain for the season. Bangalore continued to struggle during the initial games of the 2009 season, winning only two of their first six games under the new captain. However, the team's fortunes improved after Pietersen left for national duty and Kumble took over the captaincy, as the team went on to win six of their remaining eight league games to finish third on the points table. The team qualified for the semifinal where they faced the Super Kings. Electing to field first, Bangalore restricted their opponents to 146 and chased down the total with 5 wickets in hand, thanks to 48 and 44 by Pandey and Dravid respectively. In the final against Deccan Chargers, the Royal Challengers bowlers, led by Kumble's 4 for 16, kept the Chargers down to 143/6. However, they struggled in the runchase, with only four batsmen reaching double figures, and lost the match by six runs in a tense finish.

In 2010, the Royal Challengers continued under Kumble's captaincy and finished the regular season with seven wins from 14 matches and 14 points. They were one of the four teams tied on 14 points with two semifinal spots at stake; they qualified for the semifinal as their net run rate was superior to those of the Delhi Daredevils and the Kolkata Knight Riders. In the semifinal, the Royal Challengers were defeated by the table-toppers Mumbai Indians by 35 runs. With a convincing nine-wicket win over defending champions Deccan Chargers in the third-place playoff, the Royal Challengers qualified for the 2010 Champions League Twenty20. Kumble retired at the conclusion of the Champions League, having led the team to the semifinals of both the IPL and the CLT20 that year.

2011–2012: IPL and champions league Finals

On 8 January 2011, the IPL Governing Council held the auction for the fourth season of the league. The franchises had the option of retaining a maximum of four players for a sum of US$4.5 million. However, Royal Challengers retained only one of their players, Virat Kohli, leaving the rest of the players back in the auction pool. When other IPL franchises let go the non-performers from each of their teams, RCB lost the top performers from the previous season by releasing them back to the auction pool.
On Day-One of the auction, Bangalore bought Sri Lankan Tillakaratne Dilshan for $650,000, their former player and Mumbai Indians spearhead Zaheer Khan for $900,000, ace middle order batsman AB de Villiers for $1.1 million, former New Zealand skipper Daniel Vettori for $550,000, India's new sensation, who played with Mumbai Indians until last season, Saurabh Tiwary for a whopping $1.6 million, Australia's Dirk Nannes for $650,000 and India's young talent Cheteshwar Pujara for $700,000. West Indian batsman Chris Gayle was brought in as a replacement for the injured Dirk Nannes in the middle of the tournament. Vettori led the side for the fourth season of the IPL.

RCB kicked off their campaign with a comfortable six-wicket win over the newly formed team, Kochi Tuskers Kerala. But then, they suffered three big defeats at the hands of Mumbai Indians, Deccan Chargers and Chennai Super Kings. At this stage, speedster Dirk Nannes was ruled out of the tournament and the RCB team management named West Indian opener Chris Gayle as his replacement. Gayle started off the tournament with a century (102* off 55 balls) against Kolkata Knight Riders, giving the Challengers an emphatic 9-wicket win. RCB also managed to beat Delhi Daredevils and Pune Warriors in their next two matches. They went on to beat Kings XI Punjab by a big margin of 85 runs, after Gayle smashed his second century of the tournament (107 off 49 balls). They won their next two matches against Kochi and Rajasthan Royals, both comprehensively by 9 wickets. They also defeated Kolkata in a rain-affected match at Bangalore. But then, Kings XI Punjab, riding on a blistering hundred by their skipper Adam Gilchrist, ended RCB's 7-match winning streak, with a huge 111-run margin win. In their last league match, the Challengers beat the defending champions Chennai Super Kings by 8 wickets to end at the top of the points table. Chris Gayle, shining once again with the bat, scored an unbeaten 75 off 50 balls.

Royal Challengers faced Chennai Super Kings in the 1st qualifier at Mumbai. Virat Kohli scored an unbeaten 70 off just 44 balls to help RCB put up 175/4 in their 20 overs. Despite losing early wickets, Chennai went on to win the match by 6 wickets. The win took Chennai to the final and RCB faced Mumbai Indians in the 2nd qualifier in Chennai. Batting first, Royal Challengers made a massive 185/4 in 20 overs on a slow Chepauk track. Chris Gayle was the star once again for them as he scored a blistering 89 runs off 47 balls. Mumbai never looked in the hunt for a win as they collapsed to a 43-run defeat. The Royal Challengers qualified for the final with this win and went on to face Chennai at their home ground in the final. Winning the toss, Chennai elected to bat first in the final. The Super Kings posted a huge total of 205/5. The Challengers did not bat well and lost the match by 58 runs. Chris Gayle was named Man of the Tournament and Bangalore set a new IPL record for the most successive wins by winning 7 matches on the trot.

Royal Challengers Bangalore qualified for the main event of the 2011 Champions League Twenty20 as they finished runners-up in the 2011 Indian Premier League, this made the Challengers the first and only team ever to play in all the three seasons of the tournament. The Challengers, placed in Group B in the first round of the tournament, kicked off their quest for glory with a last-ball defeat to the Warriors. They suffered a big 9-wicket defeat at the hands of the IPL counterparts Kolkata Knight Riders in their second group match, leaving them with two must-win matches in order to qualify for the semi-finals. They registered their first win in the competition, in an emphatic manner, by beating Somerset by 51 runs, thanks to Chris Gayle's 46-ball 86. The win also consolidated their poor net run-rate. In their last group match, they faced the champions from Australia, the Southern Redbacks. Batting first, the Redbacks rode on a century by Daniel Harris (108* from 61 balls) to set RCB a target of 215. The Royal Challengers came out with a spirited batting performance with Tillakaratne Dilshan and Virat Kohli scoring half-centuries. However, the Redbacks hampered the run-chase by picking up wickets at regular stages towards the end of the innings. With six runs required off the last ball to win the match, RCB found an unlikely-hero in Arun Karthik, who struck Daniel Christian for a six over deep mid-wicket, to take RCB through to the semi-finals. The Challengers, despite being level on points with Kolkata Knight Riders and Warriors, qualified for the semi-finals on basis of having a better net run-rate than the two teams.

The Royal Challengers played the New South Wales Blues in the semi-finals of the tournament. Winning the toss, Daniel Vettori put the Blues in to bat and the decision seemed to backfire as the Blues amassed 203/2 in 20 overs, mainly due to the efforts of David Warner who struck an unbeaten 123 off just 68 balls. Despite losing Dilshan early in the chase, RCB got off to a rollicking start with Chris Gayle smashing 92 runs from only 41 deliveries. He was ably supported by Kohli, who struck an unbeaten 84 from 49 balls to give RCB a comfortable 6-wicket victory with 9 balls to spare. They took on an injury-hit Mumbai Indians in the final at Chennai. Mumbai winning the toss, chose to bat and put up a modest total of 139 in 20 overs. After getting off to a blistering start with the bat, the Challengers lost wickets at regular intervals before getting bundled out for 108 in 19.2 overs, falling short of the target by 31 runs. Mumbai skipper Harbhajan Singh was awarded the Man of the Match for picking 3/20 in his four overs.

In the pre-season transfer window, Royal Challengers Bangalore transferred Australian all-rounder Andrew McDonald from Delhi Daredevils. RCB paid US$100,000 as transferred fees. Royal Challengers Bangalore also retained Chris Gayle for the next two IPL seasons.

Before the 2012 auction, RCB had got Andrew McDonald transferred from Delhi Daredevils. They had also bought out the contracts of Johan Van der Wath, Jonathan Vandiar and Nuwan Pradeep. In the auction, RCB bought only Vinay Kumar for $1 million and Muttiah Muralitharan for $220,200.

Royal Challengers Bangalore began the 2012 IPL without the services of talisman Chris Gayle who had arrived in India, carrying a groin injury he had sustained in the preceding Bangladesh Premier League. Sreenath Aravind, RCB's most
successful bowler in 2011 too was laid low by injury and Harshal Patel emerged as the preferred third seamer in the side
ahead of Abhimanyu Mithun. AB de Villiers and Muttiah Muralitharan gave the team a winning start against Delhi but 3 consecutive losses followed. The team rallied back, Chris Gayle finding his touch to hit 5 consecutive sixes off
Rahul Sharma and Saurabh Tiwary hitting a six off the last ball to win the team a tight chase against Pune. Gayle shone
again at Mohali in a comprehensive win while de Villiers, Tillakaratne Dilshan and KP Appanna engineered another win in
Jaipur. A washed out match at Bangalore against Chennai denied the team a chance at gaining 2 points outright, the teams sharing
points 1-1 each. Two subsequent losses put RCB in competition with Rajasthan Royals, Chennai Super Kings and Kings XI
Punjab for the last play-offs slot. Daniel Vettori benched himself so the team could play Muttiah Muralitharan as one of the four foreigners allowed in the
playing XI, Virat Kohli taking up the captaincy duties. The team signed Prasanth Parameswaran, who played for Kochi Tuskers
Kerala in the 2011 IPL, as a replacement for the injured Sreenath Aravind. A spectacular chase against Deccan Chargers at Bangalore and two routs in Mumbai and Pune put the team back on track for a
place in the play-offs. RCB went down to Mumbai in a hard-fought match at Bangalore but bounced back in Delhi as Chris
Gayle became the first man to hit 3 centuries in the IPL, hitting 128* at Delhi.

Other results in the tournament now placed RCB in direct competition with Chennai for the final play-offs slot. The teams
were tied on points with Chennai ahead on net run-rate but RCB had a game in hand while Chennai had played out their
games. A batting failure at Hyderabad in RCB's final game of the season led to the end of the team's 2012 campaign, making
it the first time since 2009 that they failed to qualify for both the play-offs and the Champions League Twenty20. Chris Gayle was the highest run scorer of the tournament for the second year in a row, scoring 733 runs at 61.08 with 7
fifties, 1 hundred and a strike rate of 160.74. Vinay Kumar finished as the 5th highest wicket taker of the tournament
with his 19 wickets from 17 matches.

2013-2015: Kohli captaincy and intermediate seasons 

Before the 2013 auction, RCB released Mohammad Kaif, Charl Langeveldt, Dirk Nannes, Luke Pomersbach and Rilee Rossouw. At the auction, RCB bought Christopher Barnwell, Daniel Christian, Moisés Henriques, Ravi Rampaul, Pankaj Singh, R. P. Singh and Jaydev Unadkat.
RCB kicked off their 2013 campaign by winning their first 6 home games, starting with a 2-run win over Mumbai Indians where Chris Gayle scored 92* off 58 balls and Vinay Kumar picking up 3 wickets.
But they suffered a super-over defeat to the newly formed Sunrisers Hyderabad but then they beat the same opponents convincingly by 6 wickets where Virat Kohli smashed a brilliant 93*. They also beat Kolkata Knight Riders by 8 wickets. Gayle and Kohli were in a tremendous form with the bat while Vinay Kumar was the hero with the ball. RCB suffered a shock in the next match against Chennai Super Kings where R. P. Singh conceded a no-ball on the last ball of the match which was a catch. However, the team rallied back to win their next 3 games. One of the matches against Pune Warriors India saw Chris Gayle smash 175 off just 66 balls which was the highest individual score in T20 cricket and RCB put up 263-5 which was the highest total in T20 cricket. Pune never fought back in the chase and eventually lost the match by 130 runs. People often nicknamed Bangalore as "Ban-gayle-ore". However, the team began to lose matches away from home. One of the matches against Punjab saw David Miller score 101 off just 38 balls to guide Punjab to an unlikely victory. RCB only managed to beat Pune Warriors India and Delhi Daredevils away from home. They were now in direct competition with Sunrisers Hyderabad with 16 points from 13 matches who were also with 16 points from 13 matches. A batting failure against Kolkata and a poor fielding and bowling performance against Punjab at Bangalore left RCB in a do or die situation in their last league match against Chennai Super Kings at Bangalore. Fortunately, RCB registered a stunning win in their last match which was affected by rain. Now, RCB could only qualify for the playoffs if Kolkata would beat Hyderabad. Unfortunately, Sunrisers Hyderabad won the match convincingly by 5 wickets which ended RCB's 2013 campaign. Chris Gayle was the leading run scorer for the team, scoring 708 runs and Vinay Kumar was the leading wicket taker by taking 22 wickets.

Virat Kohli was named the captain of RCB team. Before the 2014 auction, AB de Villiers, Chris Gayle and Virat Kohli were retained from the previous seasons. The players bought in the 2014 auctions were Albie Morkel, Mitchell Starc, Ravi Rampaul, Parthiv Patel, Ashok Dinda, Muttiah Muralitharan, Nic Maddinson, Harshal Patel, Varun Aaron, Vijay Zol and Yuvraj Singh who was the most expensive player fetching a massive ₹14 crore. They ended up 7th in the points table and didn't qualify for the playoffs in the 2014 IPL.

RCB retained Virat Kohli, AB de Villiers, Chris Gayle, Mitchell Starc, Ashok Dinda, Varun Aaron, Harshal Patel, Yuzvendra Chahal, Nic Maddinson, Rilee Rossouw, Abu Nechim, Yogesh Takawale, Vijay Zol and Sandeep Warrier for the 2015 Indian Premier League. They also bought Manvinder Bisla and Iqbal Abdulla from Kolkata Knight Riders and Mandeep Singh from Kings XI Punjab during the Transfer Window.

Royal Challengers Bangalore started their season with an unconvincing win against KKR at Kolkata, supported by a knock of 96 by Chris Gayle. But they lost their next three matches in Bangalore to SRH, MI, and CSK. Two great bowling performances ensured RCB secured dominant wins against RR and DD, winning by 9 wickets and 10 wickets respectively. Their next match against RR got washed out after a strong batting performance from RCB. They lost a close match to CSK, but recovered by crushing Kings XI Punjab by 138 runs, supported by a century by Chris Gayle, and a four-wicket haul for Sreenath Aravind and Mitchell Starc. Royal Challengers' good form continued when AB de Villiers and Virat Kohli smashed the highest T20 partnership ever (later beaten by the same pair in IPL 2016) against Mumbai Indians, to secure a good win. Later, RCB lost to Kings XI Punjab in a rain affected match, putting their playoff qualification in doubt. They faced SRH in the next match, again affected by rain. Amidst a lot of drama, and stunning performances from Virat Kohli and Gayle, RCB won an unlikely match in Hyderabad. Now, the only way they could be out of the playoffs became very unlikely, yet possible. RCB lost their chance to be placed second in the points table after rain washed out their final match against DD.

They ended the league stage at the third position, with 7 wins from 14 matches. On 20 May, they faced the Rajasthan Royals in the Eliminator and earned a spot in Qualifier 2. However, they lost to the Chennai Super Kings in the Qualifier 2, and ended the season finishing third. AB de Villiers, Virat Kohli and Chris Gayle ended by being the 4th, 5th and 6th highest run scorers of the season respectively, while Yuzvendra Chahal was RCB's highest wicket taker, being the 3rd highest in the season.

2016: Dream Season 

In light of financial scandals involving owner/chairman Vijay Mallya, Amrit Thomas became the chairman of the Royal Challengers. RCB changed the team logo and also became the first team in IPL to adopt different jerseys for home and away matches. Virat Kohli, AB de Villiers, Chris Gayle, Mitchell Starc, David Wiese, Adam Milne, Varun Aaron, Mandeep Singh, Harshal Patel, Kedar Jadhav, Sarfaraz Khan, Sreenath Aravind, Yuzvendra Chahal, and Abu Nechim were retained by RCB for the 2016 Indian Premier League. Other players that joined the team were Sachin Baby, Iqbal Abdulla, Praveen Dubey, Akshay Karnewar, Vikramjeet Malik and Vikas Tokas. KL Rahul and Parvez Rasool also joined RCB for the IPL 2016 edition.

Royal Challengers Bangalore started their season with a blitz from AB de Villiers and Virat Kohli against SRH at Bangalore, to comfortably win their first match. A bludgeoning century from Quinton de Kock meant RCB lost their second match of the season. Their form deteriorated in the coming matches, winning only one match of the next five. Although, Virat Kohli and AB de Villier's brilliant form, along with the emergence of KL Rahul as an important member of RCB's batting, were positive points. Royal Challengers needed to win at least 6 of their next seven matches to have a chance at qualifying for the playoffs. They won matches against KXIP and Rising Pune Supergiant, the new entrant in the tournament. But a loss against Mumbai Indians meant they needed 4 wins in 4 matches to qualify. Since then, Virat Kohli found himself in a sublime form, with captaincy and the bat. RCB most notably defeated the Gujarat Lions by 144 runs, the highest margin in the IPL history, during this 4 match winning streak. Through other match results, RCB ended at an unlikely second position at the end of the league stage. Virat Kohli dominated the run-scoring list, while Shane Watson and Yuzvendra Chahal collectively topped the wicket taking list at the end of the league stage. They faced the Gujarat Lions in the Qualifier 1 at their home ground, the M. Chinnaswamy Stadium. They won by 4 wickets to make it to their third final in nine seasons. They played the final against SRH, again in Bangalore. RCB lost a hard-fought match by 8 runs, to end as runners up in this ninth season of the IPL. This is the third instance of RCB losing the final in the IPL. Yuzvendra Chahal and Shane Watson ended second and third respectively on the list for most wickets. At the launch event of his biography, 'Driven: The Virat Kohli Story' in New Delhi, in October 2016, Kohli discussed how loyalty was important to him and that he planned to never play for another IPL team.

2017–2019: Bottom-table finishes 

Virat Kohli, AB de Villiers, Chris Gayle, Mitchell Starc, Adam Milne, Mandeep Singh, Harshal Patel, Kedar Jadhav, Sarfaraz Khan, Sreenath Aravind, Yuzvendra Chahal, Shane Watson, Stuart Binny, Travis Head, Samuel Badree, Sachin Baby, Iqbal Abdulla, Praveen Dubey and KL Rahul were retained by RCB for the 2017 Indian Premier League. Mitchell Starc dropped out of the season to prepare for the Champions Trophy which led to the management to replace him with Tymal Mills. The team was the worst hit with injuries as their captain Virat Kohli and AB de Villiers did not play for the initial matches which led to the making of Shane Watson as the interim captain. Even their star players KL Rahul and Sarfaraz Khan were ruled out of the season due to their prolonged injuries.

They lost their first match of the season as they were bundled out by 172 and lost by 35 runs to Sunrisers Hyderabad in Hyderabad. But they won their second match against Delhi Daredevils in their home ground. However, they lost the next three matches in a row against Kings XI Punjab, Mumbai Indians and Rising Pune Supergiant respectively. Though AB de Villiers made a quick fire 89 off 46 balls, RCB lost the match against Kings XI Punjab as the other players made 57 dot balls. The match against Mumbai Indians saw Virat Kohli's comeback with a quick 62 off 47 balls and Samuel Badree becoming the 14th player in the IPL history to claim a hat-trick, but they lost the match as Pollard made 70 off 47 balls to win the match for Mumbai Indians. They lost the match against Rising Pune Supergiant by a massive 27 runs. But in their next game against Gujarat Lions, they won by 20 runs and coincidentally Chris Gayle became the first player to score 10,000 runs in T20s. However, in their next game against Kolkata Knight Riders, on the day when RCB made 263/5 against Pune Warriors India in 2013 which was the highest IPL score, they were bundled out for 49 all out which is the lowest IPL score and also where no batsman could score 10 runs. They kept losing matches consecutively as they could not make high scores and their big guns – Chris Gayle, Virat Kohli and AB de Villiers failing repeatedly. The pitch in M. Chinnaswamy Stadium was changed from a usual batting to the bowling pitch which made the batsmen struggle for runs. They ended up at the bottom of the table and they changed their squad for each match which was the reason for its downfall. However, they finished their miserable season on a high note after winning against Delhi Daredevils by 10 runs in Delhi. They made low scores like 49 all out against Kolkata Knight Riders, 96/9 against Rising Pune Supergiant and 119 all out against Kings XI Punjab.

In the 2018 IPL, RCB ended up 6th in the points table and didn't qualify for the playoffs. Fans of RCB started to use ee sala cup namde (this time, cup is ours) during 2017, and it became a meme trending on social media sites since 2018 before and during subsequent IPLs.

Ahead of the 2019 IPL, Royal Challengers Bangalore spent ₹16.4 crores (US$2.4 million) to buy nine players – Shivam Dube, Shimron Hetmyer, Akshdeep Nath, Prayas Barman, Himmat Singh, Gurkeerat Singh Mann, Heinrich Klaasen, Devdutt Padikkal and Milind Kumar. In-between the tournament, one of the best fast bowlers in the game Dale Steyn joined the squad and was crucial for the team's victories. Unfortunately for RCB, he was ruled out of the tournament after playing 3 matches due to a shoulder injury. Despite their hard efforts, RCB failed yet again to deliver in the group-stages. Out of the 14 games played, they won five, lost eight and tied one. Consequently, they ended at the bottom of the points table for the second time (previously in 2017).

A lot of eyes were laid on the Captain of the team Virat Kohli because he was to lead his country in the upcoming Cricket World Cup, this put a lot of pressure on the captain. In spite of this pressure, Kohli scored a total of 464 runs which included one match winning century and two half centuries, making him the second player to reach the milestone of 5,000 runs in the IPL after Chennai Super Kings' All-rounder Suresh Raina.

Even with RCB's disappointing performance in the season, most of their matches were close encounters and their fans were thoroughly entertained. At the end of the 12th season of the IPL franchise, RCB still remains among the three original teams of the franchise (the other two include Kings XI Punjab and Delhi Capitals) which haven't won the IPL trophy yet.

2020-present: Regain In Form 

Before the start of 2020 IPL, RCB has released their players: Akshdeep Nath, Colin de Grandhomme, Dale Steyn, Heinrich Klassen, Himmat Singh, Kulwant Khejroliya, Marcus Stoinis, Milind Kumar, Nathan Coulter-Nile, Prayas Ray Barman, Shimron Hetmyer and Tim Southee. During the IPL auction, they added Aaron Finch (₹4.4 crore), Chris Morris (₹10 crore), Joshua Philippe ( ₹20 lakh), Kane Richardson (₹4 crore), Pavan Deshpande (₹20 lakh), Dale Steyn (₹2 crore), Shahbaz Ahamad (₹20 lakh) and Isuru Udana (₹50 lakh). RCB released a new logo and a new jersey ahead of the 2020 season. This season saw RCB playing in the UAE with special jersey honoring the Corona warriors. 

RCB qualified for the playoffs in 2020 IPL for the first time since 2016 season. However they failed to win the title after losing to Sunrisers Hyderabad in the Eliminator. Devdutt Padikkal was the leading run scorer for the team with 473 runs, followed by Virat Kohli (466 runs) and AB de Villiers (454 runs). On the bowling front Yuzvendra Chahal lead the wicket-takers chart for the team with 21 wickets followed by Chris Morris and Mohammad Siraj (11 wickets each). 

Before the 2021 IPL season, RCB released Chris Morris, Aaron Finch, Moeen Ali, Isuru Udana, Dale Steyn, Shivam Dube, Umesh Yadav, Pawan Negi, Gurkeerat Mann, Parthiv Patel (retired). During the IPL Auction they added Glenn Maxwell, Mohammed Azharuddeen, Sachin Baby, Kyle Jamieson, Srikar Bharat, Rajat Patidar, Dan Christian, Suyash Prabhudessai, Finn Allen to their squad. This was the last season of AB de Villiers as he announced his retirement on 19 November 2021.

RCB again faced the same fate as they did in the previous season. They failed to lift the trophy once again after losing to Kolkata Knight Riders in the Eliminator. The season saw the rise of Harshal Patel as the new hero for the team as he finished the season with 32 wickets, equaling the record for highest wicket taken in a single season of IPL with Dwayne Bravo (CSK). Harshal Patel won the Purple Cap for the season. Glenn Maxwell was the highest run scorer for the team with 513 runs (fifth highest in the season).  Virat Kohli achieved the feat of becoming the first ever batter to score 6000 runs in IPL during the season. 

The 2022 season saw some major changes in the team as before the start of the season star batter AB de Villiers announced his retirement in November 2021 and RCB announced a new captain, Faf du Plessis, after former captain Virat Kohli announced his retirement from captaincy following the second leg of 2021 IPL season. They also appointed Sanjay Bangar as the new head coach.

Ahead of the IPL Mega Auction, RCB retained Virat Kohli, Glenn Maxwell and Mohammad Siraj.  During the auction they bought Shahbaz Ahmed, Wanindu Hasaranga, Harshal Patel, Finn Allen, Faf du Plessis, Mahipal Lomror, David Willey, Sherfane Rutherford, Suyash Prabhudessai, Aneeshwar Gautam, Dinesh Karthik, Anuj Rawat, Siddarth Kaul, Akash Deep, Luvnith Sisodia, Karn Sharma, Josh Hazlewood, Jason Behrendorff, Chama Milind.

The season saw the addition of two new teams making it a 10 team season. RCB finally managed to go past eliminator mark after consecutively losing in the previous two seasons, yet they failed to win the title after they lost to Rajasthan Royals in the Qualifier 2. The new captain Faf du Plessis ended the season with 468 runs, as he was the highest scorer for the team. 2022 season proved to be one of the worst for their former captain and star batter Virat Kohli as he failed to cross even 350 run mark, as he scored only 341 runs with an average of 22.73 at an strike rate of 115.98. Wanindu Hasaranga was the highest wicket taker for the team with 26 wickets to his name. 

Ahead of the 2023 season RCB bought Reece Topley, Will Jacks, Rajan Kumar, Avinash Singh, Sonu Yadav, Himanshu Sharma, Manoj Bhadange in the auction.

Team identity

Livery

Vijay Mallya wanted to associate one of his top-selling liquor brands, either McDowell's No.1 or Royal Challenge with the team. The latter was chosen, hence the name.

Logo
The logo initially consisted the RC emblem in yellow on a circular red base with the black text "Royal Challengers Bangalore" in standard format surrounding the circular logo. The RC crown emblem with the roaring lion placed on the top of the logo was derived from the original Royal Challenge logo. No significant changes took place in the design of the logo except for the replacement of colour yellow with gold from 2009. This logo also had a dotted white circle around the RC emblem. The team also uses an alternate logo for the Game for Green matches where the green plants surround the logo and the text Game for Green is placed below the logo. The logo was redesigned in 2016 with the inclusion of black as a secondary color. The lion emblem in the crest was enlarged and the shield was omitted in the new design. In 2020, a new logo was unveiled featuring a bigger lion and the crown returning from the previous logo. The RC emblem was omitted for this crest.

Jersey
The jersey colors of the team in 2008 were red and golden yellow, the same as the unofficial Kannada flag, with player names printed in white and numbers printed in black in the rear. Yellow was replaced with gold in the future seasons. Starting from 2010, blue was introduced on the apparel as a tertiary colour. The jersey design saw tweaks every season, major being the one for 2014 where blue dominated over gold. From 2014, the player names and numbers were printed in gold. As of 2015, more yellowish shade of gold was used on the jerseys. Black replaced blue as the tertiary colour in 2016. Also from 2016, two versions of the jersey were used, one for home matches and the other for away ones. The kit design remained the same until 2019. The home and away concept was scrapped from 2020 and a darker shade of blue replaced black. A design similar to the previous "home" version of the jersey was adopted for 2020 and 2021. A completely redesigned jersey with the deep blue as a dominant shade with gold accents was used in 2022 while red was seen predominantly on the trousers.

RCB also has a tradition of replacing red with green on the kits for the "Game for Green" matches which occur once a season. In 2020, as a tribute to the COVID-19 frontline workers, a match was played by RCB with sky-blue colour replacing red on the kits.

Reebok manufactured kits for the team from 2008 to 2014 and Adidas supplied the kits in 2015. Zeven manufactured the kits for the team from 2016 to 2019. Wrogn manufactured the kits in 2020 while Puma became the official kit manufacturer since 2020.

Theme song
The theme song of the team for the 2008 season was "Jeetenge Hum Shaan Se". The team anthem, "Game for More" was created for the 2009 season. The music was composed by Amit Trivedi and written by Anshu Sharma. A new anthem, "Here We Go The Royal Challengers" was created for the 2013 season and was used till 2015. The anthem "Play Bold" was composed by Salim–Sulaiman, sung by Siddharth Basrur and was released in 2016 during the launch of jerseys for the season. For 2017, the same anthem was recomposed and sung by Anand Bhaskar in 6 languages – English, Kannada, Telugu, Bengali, Marathi and Punjabi.

Ambassadors
Katrina Kaif was the brand ambassador for the team in 2008. Deepika Padukone, Ramya, Puneeth Rajkumar, Shiva Rajkumar, Upendra and Ganesh have been the ambassadors for the team in the later seasons.

Kit manufacturers and sponsors

Rivalries
Royal Challengers Bangalore have active rivalries with Chennai Super Kings, Kolkata Knight Riders and Sunrisers Hyderabad.

Rivalry with Kolkata Knight Riders 
The rivalry between Kolkata Knight Riders and Royal Challengers Bangalore is one of the oldest in the IPL. The inaugural match of IPL was played between both the teams in which KKR won by 140 runs due to a 158* off just 73 balls by Brendon McCullum.

In IPL 2009, both teams faced off against each other again in which RCB won both times. In the second time they faced each other, Ross Taylor scored a blitzkrieg 81* off 33 balls to win it for RCB by six wickets.

In the 2012 edition of IPL, KKR was at the lower half of the IPL table and needed to win the crucial match against RCB. KKR won the toss and chose to bat first. The skipper Gautam Gambhir led from the front with 93 (51). In reply, RCB lost wickets at regular intervals, as only Chris Gayle managed to put up a fight with a score of 86 (58). The next time they met, Gambhir again was the thorn of RCB as he top scored for KKR at a tough pitch, taking KKR to a competitive total of 165. RCB in reply made 129, as Lakshmipathy Balaji ripped through their lineup with a 4/18 in 4 overs.

In the 2015 IPL edition, RCB and KKR took part in a match reduced due to rain. It was reduced to a 10 over match. RCB won the toss and elected to field. For KKR, Andre Russell was the top scorer as he scored 45 off just 17 balls as he took them to a score of 111/4 in just 10 overs. Mitchell Starc took one wicket for 15 runs in 2 overs. In reply, RCB were at 0–48 at 3.4 overs before Brad Hogg got Chris Gayle out. After that, RCB stuttered and started to collapse as they were reduced to 3–81 in 7.2 overs. When Virat Kohli got out to Andre Russell, the match looked to be over for RCB. However, Mandeep Singh scored 45 off just 18 balls hitting 3 sixes and 4 fours.

In the 2017 IPL edition, Kolkata Knight Riders and Royal Challengers Bangalore locked horns with one another again. In the first match between them, RCB got KKR put for a score of 131 after KKR got off to a strong start of 0–48 in 3.3 overs. However, KKR reduced RCB to 49/9 before getting the final wicket, resulting in RCB getting the lowest score in the history of IPL – 49 all out. Nathan Coulter Nile, Colin de Grandhomme and Chris Woakes got three wickets each. In the next time they faced, Sunil Narine scored the fastest fifty of IPL then and the second fastest now (50 off 15 balls). KKR made the highest score made in powerplay in any IPL match, and chased down the target offered by RCB easily.

The 2019 IPL saw Virat Kohli scoring 84 off 49 and AB de Villiers scoring 63 off 32, taking RCB to a total of 205/3. KKR had a strong start scoring 28/0 in 1.3 overs before losing wickets at regular intervals and having their run rate reduced. They were 139/4 in 15.5 overs. Dinesh Karthik and Andre Russell however brought back the chase on control. Karthik got out scoring 19 off 15, leaving KKR at 153/5 in 17 overs. Andre Russell, however, took KKR over the line as he scored 48 off 13, hitting Mohammed Siraj for 23 runs in one over.

In the next match, RCB struck back as Virat Kohli made his 5th IPL century scoring 100 runs in 58 balls only. Moeen Ali scored 66 runs in only 28 balls as RCB scored 213 runs. For KKR, Nitish Rana scored 85 off 46 and Andre Russell scored 65 off 25, taking the game to the wire. However, RCB won the match by 10 runs, with Virat Kohli being Man of the Match.

Rivalry with Chennai Super Kings 
The rivalry with Chennai Super Kings stems from the Kaveri River water dispute between the states of Karnataka and Tamil Nadu. The rivalry is also called "Kaveri derby" and "South Indian derby". The Super Kings beat the Royal Challengers in the final of the 2011 IPL, the only meeting between the two teams at an IPL final.

Rivalry with Hyderabad franchises 
Another notable rivalry between RCB is with the Hyderabad franchises, first with Deccan Chargers and now with Sunrisers Hyderabad. The clashes between Bangalore and Hyderabad have been intense with the latter ultimately dominating the former. Deccan Chargers had won 6 out of the 11 clashes between the two and Sunrisers currently lead by 12 games to the 9 games that were won by RCB. There is also a notable trend where the Hyderabad franchise has jeopardised RCB's campaign in some way or the other. The 2009 IPL final and the 2016 IPL final were both won by the Deccan Chargers and Sunrisers Hyderabad respectively.Their 2020 clash was also at a high stake eliminator, where a fifty by Kane Williamson  trumped RCB to knock them out of IPL 2020.  The most recent example would be even with their abysmal 2021 season, SRH were able to beat a on the rise RCB at a time when RCB could have reached the top 2 but ended up in the 3rd-place resulting in them having to play the eliminator, where they ended up eventually losing to KKR to knock them out of IPL 2021. Their 2022 IPL campaign was also affected by SRH, who they lost by 9 wickets after scoring 68 in their first counter and were under pressure  because of their negative run rate throughout their otherwise strong campaign.

Support and fan following
The Royal Challengers have a huge and passionate fan base all over India and especially in the city of Bangalore. The fans, known to be loyal and vocal in their support, often turn up in large numbers for RCB's home matches turning the stadium into what is called a "sea of red". They are well known for their chants of "R-C-B, R-C-B" and chants of "A-B-D, A-B-D" for their maestro batsman AB de Villiers, and the co-ordinated Mexican wave at the Chinnaswamy. The stadium organisers also provide the home team fans with cheer kits, RCB flags and noisemakers among other items. Royal Challengers Bangalore have formed a fan-following group named as Bold Army.

During the 2014 IPL, the Royal Challengers became the first team to provide free Wi-Fi connectivity to fans at their home ground. 50 access points were set up using fibre optic cables to provide the connectivity to fans on match days at the Chinnaswamy.

Seasons

Indian Premier League

Champions League Twenty20

Current squad
 Players with international caps are listed in bold.
  denotes a player who is unavailable for rest of the season.

Administration and support staff

Result summary

By Opposition

Last Updated on 27 May 2022

References

External links
 

 
2008 establishments in Karnataka
Indian Premier League teams
Cricket in Bangalore
Sport in Karnataka
Sport in Bangalore
Cricket clubs established in 2008
United Breweries Group